Bafuor Osei Akoto (1904-2002) was a Ghanaian agriculturalist, traditional ruler and politician. He was the founder and leader of the National Liberation Movement. He was a linguist of the Asantehene and resided in the Manhyia Palace9 in Kumasi.

Early life 
He was the child of Kofi Owusu Sekyere and  Nana Akosua Apea. Before he was chosen as the chief Linguist of the Asantehene, he was a mechanic working with the transportation division of F&A Swanzy Company in the Gold Coast.

National Liberation Movement
In 1954, he organized disaffectioned Ashanti members of the Convention People's Party  to form a new political party called the National Liberation Movement. The party later became the United Party after a series of mergers with other political parties. In the early 1990s, there was another name change and the party became known as the New Patriotic Party, the current ruling party of Ghana.

He spoke against the one-party state system introduced by Dr. Kwame Nkrumah. These led to his arrest and imprisonment for seven year.

Relations
Owusu Afriyie Akoto (son) - a Cabinet minister of Ghana.
 Rita Akoto Coker (daughter). Marketing Consultant and author of 5 novels namely: Serwah, the Saga of an African Princess;The Golden Staff; Boarding Time; The Lost Princess and Fate's Promise.

See also 
 National Liberation Movement

References

Ashanti royalty
People from Ashanti Region
1904 births
2002 deaths